Bloody Run is a stream in the U.S. state of Wisconsin. It is a tributary to Nepco Lake.

Bloody Run was so named on account of the reddish hue of its iron-impregnated waters. A variant name is "Bloody Run Creek".

References

Rivers of Portage County, Wisconsin
Rivers of Wood County, Wisconsin
Rivers of Wisconsin